Kullashara is a moth genus in the family Autostichidae. It contains the species Kullashara kalifella, which is found in Iran.

References

Symmocinae